Haline Leme Scatrut (born August 9, 1992) is a Brazilian rugby sevens player. She won a bronze medal at the 2015 Pan American Games as a member of the Brazil women's national rugby sevens team. She was named in Brazil's women's sevens team to the 2016 Summer Olympics.

References

External links 
 
 
 
 
 

1992 births
Living people
Brazil international rugby sevens players
Female rugby sevens players
Olympic rugby sevens players of Brazil
Rugby sevens players at the 2016 Summer Olympics
Pan American Games bronze medalists for Brazil
Pan American Games medalists in rugby sevens
Rugby sevens players at the 2015 Pan American Games
South American Games gold medalists for Brazil
South American Games medalists in rugby sevens
Competitors at the 2018 South American Games
Medalists at the 2015 Pan American Games
Rugby sevens players at the 2020 Summer Olympics
Brazilian female rugby union players
Brazil international women's rugby sevens players
Brazilian rugby sevens players